John Joseph Bianco (February 20, 1920 – January 14, 1977) was an American professional basketball player. He played for the Toledo Jeeps in the National Basketball League during the 1946–47 season and averaged 1.0 point per game. He then played for the Portland Indians in the Pacific Coast Professional Basketball League in 1947–48, where he served as the team's player-coach and led them to the league championship.

Bianco also had a minor league baseball career. He played for the Amsterdam Rugmakers (1939), Binghamton Triplets (1940), Norfolk Tars (1941), Beaumont Exporters (1942, 1948), Kansas City Blues (1943), Portland Beavers (1947–1948).

References

1920 births
1977 deaths
American men's basketball players
Amsterdam Rugmakers players
Basketball coaches from New York (state)
Basketball players from New York City
Beaumont Exporters players
Binghamton Triplets players
Centers (basketball)
Kansas City Blues (baseball) players
Norfolk Tars players
Player-coaches
Portland Beavers players
Toledo Jeeps players